Anastasia Shuppo (born 15 November 1997) is a Belarusian footballer who plays as a midfielder for Belarusian Premier League club Dinamo Minsk and the Belarus women's national team.

Career
Shuppo has been capped for the Belarus national team, appearing for the team during the 2019 FIFA Women's World Cup qualifying cycle.

International goals

References

External links
 
 
 

1997 births
Living people
Women's association football midfielders
Belarusian women's footballers
People from Krychaw
Belarus women's international footballers
FC Minsk (women) players
Bobruichanka Bobruisk players
Sportspeople from Mogilev Region